Sebastian z Felsztyna (also Sebastian de Felstin, Roxolanus z Felsztyna, Sebastian Herburt) (14801490? – after 1543) was a Polish composer and music theorist, regarded as the greatest Polish composer of the early 16th century.

Life
He was probably born in Felsztyn, Kingdom of Poland (now Skelivka, Ukraine). In 1507 he entered Kraków University, the same year as his compatriot, composer Mikołaj z Chrzanowa.  While there he studied music and theology, receiving his baccalaureate in 1509.  He may have studied with Heinrich Finck while in Kraków.  After graduating, he returned to Felsztyn where he became a chaplain, and later he went to Sanok, also in southeastern Poland, where he was a provost.

Musical works and theoretical writings
Of his musical works, only three motets survive.  They are for four voices, and use a plainchant tenor in long notes – an archaic practice at the time of publication, 1522 – with the other voices sometimes engaging in imitation, in free counterpoint, or in more homophonic textures.  All three are preserved in Wawel Cathedral in manuscript.  While archaic in style, they show the influence of the Franco-Flemish school, and are a rare early example of four-voice polyphony in Poland. Indeed, Reese acknowledges Felstin's assimilation of Franco-Burgundian influences.

Sebastian published a collection of his hymns in 1522 in Kraków, Aliquot hymni ecclesiastici, but no copies survive.

Sebastian's theoretical treatises cover the topics of notation and chant.  His most popular was Opusculum musices of 1519, which was twice reprinted, and most likely was intended as an instructional tool for singers.

Works

Writings on music
Opusculum musice compilatum noviter
Opusculum musices noviter congestum
De musica dialogi VI (Kraków, 1536)
Directiones musicae ad cathedralis ecclesia Premislensis usum (Kraków, 1543)
Opusculum musice mensuralis (Kraków, 31 October 1517)
De inventoribus musicae

Motets
Ave Maria ("Alleluia ad Rorate cum prosa Ave Maria"), four voices
Alleluia, Felix es sacra virgo Maria, four voices
Prosa ad Rorate tempore paschali virgini Mariae laudes, four voices

These three motets, according to Reese (1959, p. 747) all feature Gregorian melodies in the tenor in whole notes.

Notes

Sources
 
Stępień B., Sebastian z Felsztyna, "Kamerton", 2005 Nr 1-2 (48-49), s. 242-245. .
Mała encyklopedia muzyki (A Little Encyclopedia of Music), Warszawa 1981

External links
 Works by Sebastian z Felsztyna in the National Digital Library of Poland (Polona)

Polish composers
Polish music theorists
16th-century Polish Roman Catholic priests
Renaissance composers
Ukrainian classical composers
1480s births
1540s deaths
Polish male classical composers